The Hickory Ridge Landfill is a municipal solid waste landfill located in Conley, Georgia, United States, and privately owned by Republic Services. The site was opened in 1993 and closed in 2006; it contains nearly 9,000,000 cubic yards (6,880,994 cubic meters) of waste.

Developed by Carlisle Energy Services, the closure system provides renewable electricity via (photovoltaic) solar panels,

The project is the second installation of an EGSC and is the world's largest installed system of its kind. At the time of commissioning it was the largest solar photovoltaic system in the state of Georgia. It also represents a $5,000,000 investment by Republic Services supported by a $2,000,000 grant from the Georgia Environmental Finance Authority (GEFA).

System Details 
The landfill closure system features a green, 60-mil scrim reinforced TPO (thermoplastic polyolefin) geomembrane cover 48 acres in total.

Each photovoltaic roll was rated at 5,184 Wp DC. 

The closure system meets infiltration and erosion criteria as prescribed by the United States Environmental Protection Agency, while also capturing the methane gas that is generated by the landfill, turning it into energy in a separate operation. The Georgia Environmental Protection Division approved the landfill closure system as a "Final" closure system.

The photovoltaic system is actually composed of four separate arrays located on the 3H:1V slopes on the southeast and southwest areas of the landfill. Each photovoltaic array is rated for approximately 250kWp DC each; each with a 260kWp DC inverter.

The photovoltaic array is expected to generate 1,300,000 kWh in its first year of production.

Awards 

HDR Inc. received the following awards for their engineering work on this project:

 2012 – Grand Award, Engineering Excellence Awards, American Council of Engineering Companies of Georgia
 2012 – ⁣Honor Award, Engineering Excellence Awards, American Council of Engineering Companies
 2012 – ⁣Honor Award, American Academy of Environmental Engineers

American Environmental Group (AEG) received the 2013 Award of Excellence from the International Association of Geosynthetic Installers (IAGI) for their work as the geomembrane installer for the project

Related 
 View an actual time-elapsed construction video of the Hickory Ridge project
 Read a recent article about solar and landfills titled "Fill of Energy" that was published in PV Magazine in July 2012
 Read an announcement for a Spectra Power Cap that was recently installed at the Madison County Landfill in New York
 Mas Energy secured the landfill gas rights for the Hickory Ridge Landfill from Republic Services, supplying fuel to their 6.5 Megawatt combined heat and power facility located at Coca-Cola's Cogen Plant in Atlanta, GA.   Coca-Cola ranked third in the Top 20 Onsite Green Power Generators by the U.S. EPA Green Power Partnership as of July 5, 2012 mainly because of this system and the landfill gas from Hickory Ridge
 CNN:  Solar landfill provides a shining example
 Scientific American:  Solar energy covers turn maxed-out landfills into solar farms
 EastAtlantaPatch:  From Landfill To Solar Energy Farm 
 Waste360:  Preview of the Solar Installation at Hickory Ridge
  Fox News:  Trash Today, Electricity Tomorrow, Thanks to Landmark Solar Energy Farm

References 

Geography of DeKalb County, Georgia
Landfills in the United States
Photovoltaic power stations in the United States